The DeLand Sun Caps were a minor league baseball team, based in DeLand, Florida, as a member of the Florida State League for one season in 1970. They were the last team to represent DeLand in the Florida State League. Prior to 1970 the city did not host another FSL team since the DeLand Red Hats left in 1954.

References
Baseball Reference - Deland, Florida

Baseball teams established in 1970
Defunct Florida State League teams
Defunct baseball teams in Florida
Sports clubs disestablished in 1970
1970 establishments in Florida
1970 disestablishments in Florida
Sports in Volusia County, Florida
DeLand, Florida
Baseball teams disestablished in 1970